The Bambalang language, also called Chrambo (Chirambo, Tshirambo) or Mbawyakum (Mboyakum), is a Grassfields Bantu language of Cameroon.

References

Languages of Cameroon
Nun languages